The 2nd Illinois Cavalry Regiment was a cavalry regiment that served in the Union Army during the American Civil War.

Service
Companies "A" to "L of the  2nd Illinois Cavalry was mustered into service at Camp Butler, Illinois, on August 12, 1861.  Company "M"" was mustered in on December 30, 1861.

The regiment was mustered out on December 30, 1865.

Total strength and casualties
The regiment suffered 8 officers and 50 enlisted men who were killed in action or who died of their wounds and 3 officers and 173 enlisted men who died of disease, for a total of 234 
fatalities.

Commanders
Colonel Silas Noble - mustered out February 16, 1863
Colonel John J. Mudd - killed in action May 3, 1864
Colonel Daniel B. Bush, Jr. - discharged July 24, 1865
Colonel Benjamin F. Marsh

See also
List of Illinois Civil War Units
Illinois in the American Civil War

Notes

References
The Civil War Archive

Units and formations of the Union Army from Illinois
1861 establishments in Illinois
Military units and formations established in 1861
Military units and formations disestablished in 1865